Jorge Echagüe, popularly known as Coco Echagüe, (born June 17, 1971)  is a Uruguayan actor, singer and television presenter.

Television

Theater

References

External links 

 

 

1971 births
Living people
Uruguayan television presenters
21st-century Uruguayan male actors
20th-century Uruguayan male singers
21st-century Uruguayan male singers